Givira eureca is a moth in the family Cossidae. It is found in Guatemala.

The wingspan is about 43 mm. The forewings are silky, greyish white, with some dark brown striae 
except on the extreme costa. The inner margin is shaded with brown. The hindwings are fuscous grey.

References

Natural History Museum Lepidoptera generic names catalog

Moths described in 1921
Givira